Charles Herbert Frend (21 November 1909, Pulborough, Sussex – 8 January 1977, London) was an English film director and editor, best known for his films produced at Ealing Studios. He began directing in the early 1940s and is known for such films as Scott of the Antarctic (1948) and The Cruel Sea (1953).

Biography
Frend was born in Pulborough, Sussex, on 21 November 1909 to Edward Charles and Bertha Maud Frend. He was educated at The King's School, Canterbury and at Oxford University, where he was the film critic of The Isis Magazine.

Editor
He began his career in the film industry at British International Pictures in 1931. He worked as an editor on Arms and the Man (1932)

Frend moved to Gaumont British Pictures, where he worked under producer Michael Balcon. He edited Alfred Hitchcock's Waltzes from Vienna (1934), then My Song for You (1934), Oh, Daddy! (1934), Tom Walls' Fighting Stock (1935), The Tunnel (1935), and Car of Dreams (1935).

Frend was reunited with Hitchcock for Secret Agent (1936) and Sabotage (1936); in between he did East Meets West (1936).

Frend was borrowed by Alexander Korda for Conquest of the Air (1936). He returned to Gaumont British to edit The Great Barrier (1936) and Hitchcock's Young and Innocent (1937).

MGM-British
When Michael Balcon went over to work for MGM British at Denham Film Studios, he brought Frend with him. While there, Frend edited A Yank at Oxford (1938), The Citadel (1938) and Goodbye Mr. Chips (1939).

Korda used him again for The Lion Has Wings (1939). He was hired by Gabriel Pascal for Major Barbara (1941). By now he was established as one of the leading editors in Britain but he wanted to direct.

Director
Michael Balcon had taken over Ealing Studios and he gave Frend the chance to direct his first feature, the semi-documentary The Big Blockade (1942), which Frend also co-wrote. Frend developed as one of Ealing's key directors, along with Charles Crichton, Alexander Mackendrick and Robert Hamer.

Frend followed his first feature with The Foreman Went to France (1943) and San Demetrio London (1943); Robert Hamer finished the latter after Frend fell ill. He did a short subject, The Return of the Vikings (1943), then Johnny Frenchman (1945).

Post-war films
Frend's first non-war film was a melodrama, The Loves of Joanna Godden (1947), adapted from the novel Joanna Godden (1921) by Sheila Kaye-Smith. He followed it with Scott of the Antarctic (1948), a biopic that was hugely successful at the British box office.

Frend shifted into comedy, making A Run for Your Money (1949) and The Magnet (1950). He returned to war films with The Cruel Sea (1953), the most successful film at the British box office in 1953.

Frend did a drama with Robert Donat, Lease of Life (1954). His film The Long Arm (1956) won the Silver Bear for an Outstanding Single Achievement award at the 6th Berlin International Film Festival.

Frend directed Alec Guinness in Barnacle Bill (1957), the penultimate Ealing comedy. The studio would soon be sold.

Television
Frend moved into television, directing episodes of Interpol Calling, Schilling Playhouse and Danger Man. He returned to films with Cone of Silence (1960) for Balcon's new Bryanston Films, and Girl on Approval (1961).

Frend then did some more TV - Man of the World, The Sentimental Agent, Zero One - then another feature, Torpedo Bay (1963) with James Mason.

Final Productions
His last credit as principal director was The Sky Bike (1967) for the Children's Film Foundation. He did episodes of Man in a Suitcase, and did second unit directing on Guns in the Heather and David Lean's Ryan's Daughter (1970).

Frend died in a hospital in London on 8 January 1977, aged 67, after a long illness.

Selected filmography

Arms and the Man (1932) - editor
Waltzes from Vienna (1934) - editor
My Song for You (1934) - editor
Oh, Daddy! (1935) - editor
 Fighting Stock (1935) - editor
The Tunnel (1935) - editor
Car of Dreams (1935) - editor
Secret Agent (1936) - editor
East Meets West (1936) - editor
Sabotage (1936) - editor
The Conquest of the Air (1936) - editor, narrator
The Great Barrier (1937) - editor
Young and Innocent (1937) - editor
A Yank at Oxford (1938) - editor
The Citadel (1938) - editor
Goodbye, Mr. Chips (1939) - editor
The Lion Has Wings (1939) - editor
Major Barbara (1941) - editor
The Big Blockade (1942) - director, writer
The Foreman Went to France (1943) - director
The Saving Grave (1943) (short) - director
San Demetrio London (1943) - director, writer
The Return of the Vikings (1944) - director, writer
Johnny Frenchman (1945) - director
The Loves of Joanna Godden (1947) - director
Scott of the Antarctic (1948) - director
A Run for Your Money (1949) - director, writer
The Magnet (1950) - director
The Cruel Sea (1953) - director
Lease of Life (1954) - director
The Long Arm (1956) - director
Barnacle Bill (1957) - director
Interpol Calling (1959–60) (TV series) - director
Danger Man (1960–61) (TV series) - director
Cone of Silence (1960) - director
Rendezvous (1959–61) (TV series) - director
Girl on Approval (1961) - director
Man of the World (1962) (TV series)- director
Zero One (1963) (TV series) - director
Torpedo Bay (1963) - director
The Sentimental Agent (1963) (TV series) - director
The Sky Bike (1967) - director, writer
Man in a Suitcase (1968) (TV series) - director
Guns in the Heather (1969) - 2nd unit director
Ryan's Daughter (1970) - 2nd unit director

Personal life 
In his entry in Who's Who, Frend listed 'the cinema' as his recreation. In 1940, Frend married Sonja Petra Baade Thorburn. Frend was a life-long friend of producer Sir Michael Balcon. After his death in 1977, Balcon wrote that "this broadminded, liberal man [Frend] without any trace of chauvinism in his outlook nevertheless had a proper pride in Britain and the British people and it is this characteristic which emerges so strongly in all his work."

References

External links

Charles Frend at BFI
Charles Frend at BFI Screenonline
Charles Frend at Letterbox DVD

1909 births
1977 deaths
English film editors
English film directors
People from Pulborough